Che Yaoxian (1894–1946) was a member of the Chinese Communist Party and an officer in the Sichuan army. In 1921, after meeting a local preacher in Jianyang, he converted to Christianity. In 1927, he represented Sichuan at the East Asian Christian Association conference in Shanghai. Sometime in the 1930s, he founded the anti-imperialist Chengdu Christian Improvement Association, which advocated for "self-nourishing" and "self-propagation". However, he also experienced crises of faith, such as in 1928, when he lamented in a poem titled "Oath to Myself": "Religion merely deceives foolish people."

References

Citations

Bibliography

 

1894 births
1946 deaths